Södermanland County held a county council election on 14 September 2014 across its nine municipalities. This was part of the 2014 Swedish local elections. It was held on the same day as the general and municipal elections.

Results
The number of seats remained at 71. The Social Democrats won the most seats at 23, a drop of four from 2010.

Municipal results
Vård för pengarna becoming the largest party in Nyköping marked the first time the Social Democrats had not topped a poll in either the city of Nyköping or the post-1970's municipality for more than a century. The nine municipalities were divided into four separate constituencies based on geography, in which Eskilstuna was a unitary constituency.

References

Elections in Södermanland County
Södermanland